Jaskółki may refer to the following places:
Jaskółki, Grodzisk Wielkopolski County in Greater Poland Voivodeship (west-central Poland)
Jaskółki, Ostrów Wielkopolski County in Greater Poland Voivodeship (west-central Poland)
Jaskółki, Radomsko County in Łódź Voivodeship (central Poland)